Andreas Ihle (born 2 June 1979 in Bad Dürrenberg, Saxony-Anhalt) is a German sprint canoer who has competed since 1997. Competing in three Summer Olympics, he has won three medals with a gold (K-2 1000 m: 2008), a silver (K-4 1000 m: 2004) and a bronze (K-2 1000 m: 2012).

Ihle also won six medals at the ICF Canoe Sprint World Championships with two gold (K-2 1000 m: 2010, K-4 1000 m: 2001), three silvers (K-2 1000 m: 2005, 2006; K-4 1000 m: 2002), and a bronze (K-4 1000 m: 2003).

Ihle is a member of the Magdeburg club. Ihle measures at 1.84 m / 6'0 tall and weighs 78 kg / 172 lbs.

References

External links 
 
 
 

1979 births
Living people
People from Saalekreis
Canoeists at the 2000 Summer Olympics
Canoeists at the 2004 Summer Olympics
Canoeists at the 2008 Summer Olympics
Canoeists at the 2012 Summer Olympics
German male canoeists
Olympic canoeists of Germany
Olympic gold medalists for Germany
Olympic silver medalists for Germany
Olympic medalists in canoeing
Olympic bronze medalists for Germany
ICF Canoe Sprint World Championships medalists in kayak
Medalists at the 2012 Summer Olympics
Medalists at the 2008 Summer Olympics
Medalists at the 2004 Summer Olympics
Sportspeople from Saxony-Anhalt